Robert Braber (born 9 November 1982) is a Dutch football manager and former player who played as a midfielder. He is the head coach of Tweede Klasse club RBC.

Club career
His former clubs are NAC Breda and Helmond Sport. Braber moved from Excelsior to Swansea City in the Coca Cola Championship on 22 June 2009 on trial, and signed then a one-year contract with FC Ingolstadt 04 on 3 July 2009.

In the summer of 2016, Braber returned to former club Helmond Sport.

Managerial career
After having worked as team-manager for his former club RKC Waalwijk since his retirement from football in 2018, Braber was appointed head coach of RBC in February 2021 where he succeeded Koos Waslander.

Honours

Club
RKC Waalwijk:
Eerste Divisie: 2010–11

References

External links
 Voetbal International profile 
 

1982 births
Living people
Footballers from Rotterdam
Association football midfielders
Dutch footballers
Excelsior Rotterdam players
NAC Breda players
Helmond Sport players
FC Ingolstadt 04 players
RKC Waalwijk players
Willem II (football club) players
Eredivisie players
Eerste Divisie players
3. Liga players
Dutch expatriate footballers
Expatriate footballers in Germany
Dutch expatriate sportspeople in Germany
Dutch football managers
RBC Roosendaal managers